NIMCJ, formerly National Institute of Mass Communications and Journalism, Ahmedabad is a higher education institute for Mass Communication in India. It was established by Vishwa Samvad Education Foundation in 2007. It is located at Bodakdev, Sarkhej Gandhinager Highway, the western Indian city of Ahmedabad. NIMCJ is the pioneer institute to introduce Radio Journalism and Digital Media in media academics in Gujarat. The institute is recognized by Gujarat University.

History
NIMCJ was established in 2007 by Vishwa Samvad Education Foundation.

Ranking
NIMCJ, a mass communication college, was ranked 13th in 2018 and 14th in 2019 by Outlook India among top mass communication colleges in India and 34 among top mass comm colleges in India by India Today in 2019.

NIMCJ Awarded by Education Department and Knowledge Consortium of Gujarat (KCG) - Government of Gujarat for "Excellence in Placement".

Academics
NIMCJ offers professional course like Post Graduate Diploma in Mass Communication and Journalism, a two-year full-time course in media fields i.e. Print Journalism, electronic media, Radio, Advertising, Digital Media, Public Relations, Corporate Communication.

NIMCJ successfully completed 11th year and entered in 12th year of its commencement. From this year 2019, started offering three years of Bachelor of Journalism and Mass Communication (BJMC) course affiliated to Gujarat University.

NIMCaR
The RSS-promoted trust, VSEF - Vishwa Samvad Education Foundation, already runs a media institute in Ahmedabad since 2007 via National Institute of Mass Communication and Journalism (NIMCJ). It will be amalgamated into National Institute of Mass Communication and Research (NIMCaR) that will come up in Hajipur village, about 32 km from Ahmedabad.

VSEF will spend Rs 100 crore to set up a National Media Institute in Gujarat across a 10-acre campus equipped with the technologically advanced studio, Media Research Centre, Media Museum and other facilities with the aim to transform media and communication education in India.

References

External links
 

Universities and colleges in Gujarat
Educational institutions established in 2007
2007 establishments in Gujarat
Journalism schools in India